Pukara (Aymara for fortress, Hispanicized spelling Pucara) is a  mountain in the Bolivian Andes. It lies in the La Paz Department, Loayza Province, Sapahaqui Municipality.

References 

Mountains of La Paz Department (Bolivia)